Totoral del Sauce is a village or populated centre in the Canelones Department of southern Uruguay.

Geography

Location

Population
In 2011 Totoral del Sauce had a population of 746.
 
Source: Instituto Nacional de Estadística de Uruguay

References

External links
INE map of Totoral del Sauce

Populated places in the Canelones Department